Valerii Oleksandrovych Andriitsev (born 27 February 1987 in Kozelets) is a male freestyle wrestler from Ukraine. He won the silver medal in the Men's freestyle 96 kg at 2012 Summer Olympics. He won the silver in the 2012 European Wrestling Championships. At the 2014 World Wrestling Championships he took the bronze medal after winning a rematch against American Jake Varner, who beat him in the gold medal match at the 2012 Olympics.  In June 2015, he earned bronze at the inaugural European Games for Ukraine in wrestling, more specifically, in the men's freestyle in the - 97 kg division.

References

External links
 bio on fila-wrestling.com
 

1987 births
Sportspeople from Kyiv
Living people
Wrestlers at the 2012 Summer Olympics
Wrestlers at the 2016 Summer Olympics
Ukrainian male sport wrestlers
Olympic wrestlers of Ukraine
Olympic silver medalists for Ukraine
Olympic medalists in wrestling
Medalists at the 2012 Summer Olympics
European Games bronze medalists for Ukraine
Wrestlers at the 2015 European Games
European Games medalists in wrestling
World Wrestling Championships medalists
European Wrestling Championships medalists
20th-century Ukrainian people
21st-century Ukrainian people